Ibri is a city and Wilāyat (Province) in the Ad Dhahirah Governorate, in northwest Oman.

Ancient history 

Ibri Province (Wilayat Ibri) is distinguished by archaeological landmarks including forts, castles, and towers. In 1979 the largest metal hoard in the ancient Near East came to light in ʿIbri-Selme. Also, there are the remains of the town of Bat, which is the second archaeological site to be classified by UNESCO on the list of world heritage and culture sites, after the Bahla Fort in the A’Dakhliya district. The protohistoric archaeological complex of Bat, al-Khutm and al-Ayn represents one of the most complete and well-preserved ensembles of settlements and necropolises from the 3rd millennium BCE worldwide. Further extensions of the site of Bat are represented by the monumental tower at al-Khutm and by the necropolis at Al-Ayn. Together, monumental towers, rural settlements, irrigation systems for agriculture, and necropolises embedded in a fossilized Bronze Age landscape, form a unique example of cultural relics in an exceptional state of preservation.

The earliest known tower at Bat is the mud-brick Hafit period structure underneath the Early Umm An-Nar stone tower at Matariya. The latest known tower is probably Kasr al-Rojoom, which can be ceramically dated to the Late Umm an-Nar period (ca. 2200–2000). All of the stone-built towers show dressed blocks of local limestone laid carefully with simple mud mortar. While conclusive evidence of their function is still missing, they seem to be platforms on which superstructures (now missing) were built – either houses, or temples, or something else entirely. The vast necropolis at Bat includes different clusters of monumental tombs that can be divided into two distinct groups. The first group is Hafit-period "beehive" tombs located on the top of the rocky slopes surrounding Bat, while the second group extends over a river terrace and includes more than a hundred dry-stone cairn tombs. Most of these tombs are small, single-chambered, round tombs with dry masonry walls dating to the beginning of the 3rd millennium BCE. Others are more elaborate, bigger, multi-chambered tombs from the second half of the 3rd millennium BCE. As in many other ancient civilizations, monuments in ancient Oman were usually built with regularly cut stones. Unique of Bat and Al-Ayn are the remains the ancient quarries from which the building materials were mined, and the many workshops that attest to the complete operational procedure, from the quarries, to the stone-masonry, to the buildings construction techniques. The continuous and systematic survey activities constantly increase the types and number of monuments and sites to be documented and protected, which include villages and multiple towers, quarries associated with the Bronze Age stone-masonry workshops, Bronze Age necropolises, an Iron Age fort, Iron Age tombs, and two Neolithic flint mines connected with workshop areas for stone tool-making.

Climate 
Ibri is characterized by a hot desert climate (Köppen-Geiger climate classification BWh). Most of the rainfall occurs in winter.

Economy 

Historically, Ibri was known for its market and for fruit.

Ibri is currently a center for marble quarrying. In 2022, a landslide killed 10 quarry workers in the Al Aridh area of Ibri.

The Ibri area is also home to the Ibri 2 Solar Power Plant, a 500-megawatt solar farm that is Oman's largest renewable energy project. Completed in 2022 by a consortium of companies from Saudi Arabia, Kuwait, and other Gulf states, the project is expected to power 33,000 homes. The plant consists of 1.4 million solar panels and covers an area of 13 million square meters.

Education 
There are many government primary and secondary schools in the wilayah plus some private primary schools and one Indian school. In terms of higher education, there is the Ibri College of Technology and a College of Applied Sciences.
In addition to this, there are many institutes offering various courses.

The United States Department of State-funded Critical Language Scholarship Program offers Arabic-language training in Ibri, through the Noor Majan Training Institute.

Culture 
Ibri was one of three locations in Ad Dhahirah Governorate to host the first Al Dhahirah International Film Festival, in October 2022.

Transport 
Ibri is connected by road to the UAE city of Al-Ain, via the Mezyad border post near Jebel Hafeet. This road also goes through the Wilayat of Dhank and to Nizwa.

See also 
 Al-Buraimi
 Sunaynah
 Biladhi Shuhoom
 Railway stations in Oman - planned 2015

References

Articles 
 
 
  Magazine Article on Ibri

Populated places in Ad Dhahirah North Governorate
Ad Dhahirah Governorate